Kim Chae-yeon may refer to: 
 Kim Chae-yeon (singer) (born 2004), South Korean singer, born Kim Chae-yeon
 Kim Chae-yeon (actress) (born 1977), South Korean actress
 Kim Chae-yeon (figure skater) (born 2006), South Korean figure skater
 Kim Chae-yeon (gymnast) (born 1998), South Korean artistic gymnast
 Kim Chae-yeon (volleyball) (born 1999), South Korean volleyball player